The 1952 Durand Cup Final was the 49th final of the Durand Cup, the oldest football competition in India, and was contested between Kolkata giant East Bengal and Hyderabad City Police on 23 November 1952 at the Delhi Gate Stadium in New Delhi.

East Bengal won the final 1–0 to claim their 2nd Durand Cup title. Pansanttom Venkatesh scored the only goal for East Bengal in the final as East Bengal lifted their second Durand Cup title.

Route to the final

Match

Summary
The Durand Cup final began at the Delhi Gate Stadium in New Delhi on 23 November 1952 in front of a packed crowd as Kolkata giant East Bengal and faced Hyderabad City Police. East Bengal, the defending champions, reached their second consecutive Durand Cup final after defeating Hindustan Aircraft 2–0 in the semi-final. Hyderabad City Police also made their second appearance in the final after they defeated Aryan 1–0 in the semi-final, having previously won the cup in 1950. 

East Bengal and Hyderabad City Police, both tried to take control of the game from the first minute, however, neither could break the deadlock until three minutes before the halftime, when Ramana found Pansanttom Venkatesh free inside the box with a measured pass, who made no error to find the net and make it 1–0 for East Bengal. Hyderabad got perhaps the easiest chance to equalise just two minutes later but Mahmood missed the chance. In the second half, Hyderbad went all out to find the equaliser but were denied by the East Bengal defence led by Dorailingam and Dr. P. Kumar as East Bengal managed to hold onto the scoreline and successfully defend their Durand Cup title, thus becoming the first Indian team to win the Durand Cup more than once.

Details

References

External links
Durand Cup Finals

Durand Cup finals
East Bengal Club matches
1952–53 in Indian football
Football competitions in Kolkata